The following is a list of notable people associated with St Anne's College, Oxford, including alumnae, academics, and principals of the college.

As a former women's college, St Anne's continues to refer to former students, male or female, as "alumnae".

The list includes people associated with the Society of Oxford Home-Students and St Anne's Society prior to the official founding of the College.

Alumnae

Danny Alexander (born 1972) – Knighted Liberal Democrat MP for Inverness, Nairn, Badenoch & Strathspey, Chief Secretary to the Treasury
Mary Applebey (1916–2012) – mental health campaigner and co-founder of MIND 
Mary Archer (born 1944) – baroness and scientist specialising in solar power conversion
Karen Armstrong (born 1944) – FRSL – author on comparative religion
Jackie Ashley (born 1954) – broadcaster, journalist and contributor to The Guardian and New Statesman
Wendy Beckett (1930–2018) – BBC art historian
Dame Gillian Beer (born 1935) – literary critic and former President of Clare Hall, Cambridge (1994–2001)
Nicola Blackwood (born 1979) – Conservative MP for Oxford West and Abingdon (2010–17)
Mark Bostridge (born 1961) – writer and critic, biographer of Vera Brittain and Florence Nightingale
Tina Brown (born 1953), CBE – writer, and magazine editor of The Daily Beast, Vanity Fair and The New Yorker
C. Violet Butler (1884–1892) – Social researcher and educator active in Oxford
Frances Cairncross (born 1944), DBE, CBE – journalist, economist, and Rector of Exeter College, Oxford (2004–2014)
Rosemary Cramp (born 1929) – archaeologist specialising in Anglo-Saxon literature and culture
Edwina Currie (born 1946) – Conservative MP and minister (1983–1997)
Liam D'Arcy-Brown (born 1970) – Sinologist and travel writer
Ruth Deech (born 1943) – baroness, DBE – lawyer, bioethicist, and former Principal of St Anne's (1991–2004)
Paul Donovan (born 1972) – economist and author
Mary Douglas (1921–2007) – dame, DBE, FBA, anthropologist
Anne Dreydel (1918–2007) – OBE, co-founder of Oxford English Centre, now St Clare's International School
Rose Dugdale (born 1941) – debutante, then IRA member and art thief 
Moira Dunbar (1918–1999) – Arctic ice researcher
U. A. Fanthorpe (1929–2009), CBE, FRSL – poet
Penelope Farmer (born 1939) – children's writer
Helen Fielding (born 1958) – novelist known for the Bridget Jones series
Helen Fraser (born 1949) – executive and publisher
Hadley Freeman (born 1978) – writer and columnist for The Guardian and Vogue
Urszula Gacek (born 1963) – Polish politician, since 2011 Poland's Ambassador to The Council of Europe 
Helen Palmer Geisel (1898–1967) – children's book author and co-founder of Beginner Books
Sanjay Ghose (1959–1997) – Indian rural development activist.
Jean Golding (born 1939) – epidemiologist
Sarah Gristwood (living) – journalist and author
Miriam Gross (living) – literary editor and co-founder of Standpoint magazine
Mary Harron (born 1953) – Canadian director/screenwriter, best known for American Psycho
Zoë Heller (born 1965) – journalist and novelist known for Notes on a Scandal
Miriam Hodgson (1938–2005) – editor of children's books
Brad Hooker (born 1957) – philosopher specialising in ethics, Professor of Philosophy at Reading University
Nancy Hubbard (born 1963) – professor and Miriam Katowitz Chair of Management and Accounting at Goucher College, Baltimore
Mr Hudson (Ben Hudson) (born 1979) – pop musician
Devaki Jain (born 1933) – Indian economist, writer and feminist
Diana Wynne Jones (1934–2011) – fantasy novelist known for Chrestomanci series and Howl's Moving Castle
Martha Kearney (born 1957) – broadcaster and journalist with BBC Radio 4
Sandra Landy (1938–2017) – world champion bridge player and computer scientist
Penelope Lively (born 1933) – CBE, FRSL, novelist and Booker Prize winner for Moon Tiger
Guy Lynn (living) – investigative reporter for the BBC
William MacAskill (born 1987) – philosopher, co-founder of Effective Altruism movement
Mercia MacDermott (born 1927) – writer and historian 
Kevin Macdonald – film director, The Last King of Scotland and State of Play
Sara Maitland (born 1950) – fiction writer
Max More (born 1964) – philosopher and futurist, founder of Extropy Institute
Rebecca Morelle (living) – journalist, global science correspondent for BBC News
Sizwe Mpofu-Walsh (born 1989) – South African author, musician and activist
Lindsay Northover (born 1954) – baroness, Liberal Democrat member of House of Lords since 2000
Una O'Brien (living), Permanent Secretary Department of Health
Nuala O'Faolain (1940–2008) – writer, broadcaster and feminist 
Nicola Padfield (born 1955) – Master of Fitzwilliam College, Cambridge, Professor of Criminal and Penal Justice at Law Faculty, University of Cambridge
Ruma Pal (born 1941) – justice of the Supreme Court of India
Adam Parsons (born 1970) – television and radio presenter
Ged Quinn (born 1963) – artist and musician
Norah Lillian Penston (1903–1974) – Principal of Bedford College, University of London
Melanie Phillips (born 1951) – journalist and author, winner of Orwell Prize
Libby Purves (born 1950) – OBE, radio presenter and drama critic for The Times
Janina Ramirez (born 1980) – art historian, lecturer and TV presenter
Simon Rattle (born 1955) – CBE, FRSA, orchestral conductor for Berlin Philharmonic and London Symphony Orchestra
Mary Remnant (1935–2020) – medieval musicologist and musician 
Gillian Reynolds (born 1935) – MBE, journalist and broadcaster 
John Robins (born 1982) – stand-up comedian and radio presenter
Jancis Robinson (born 1950) – OBE, wine critic and author
James Rutledge (living) – musician and producer
Cicely Saunders (1918–2005) – dame, OM, social worker, physician, writer and pioneer of hospice movement
Frances Stonor Saunders (born 1966) – journalist, film-maker and associate editor of New Statesman
Samantha Shannon (born 1991) – author of The Bone Season dystopian fiction series
Susan Sontag (1933–2004) – US writer, literary theorist and political activist
Susan J. Smith (born 1956) – Mistress of Girton College, Cambridge, Honorary Professor, Department of Geography, University of Cambridge
Harriet Spicer (born 1950) – publisher
Russell Taylor (born 1960) – MBE, journalist and composer
Jane Thynne (born 1961) – novelist, journalist and broadcaster
Polly Toynbee (born 1946) – journalist with The Guardian, writer and broadcaster
Victor Ubogu (born 1964) – Rugby player for Bath Rugby, businessman
Jenny Uglow (born 1947) – OBE, critic and noted biographer, editorial director of Chatto and Windus
Hilary Wainwright (born 1949) – feminist
Jill Paton Walsh (1937–2020) – CBE, novelist and children's writer
Victoria Whitworth (born 1966) – Anglo-Scots novelist, archaeologist and art historian
Ivy Williams (1877–1966) – first woman called to the English bar
Mara Yamauchi (born 1973) – long-distance track and marathon runner
Janet Young (1926–2002) – baroness, Conservative politician, first female Leader of the House of Lords

Academics

Peter Ady – Fellow (1947–2004), eminent development economist, adviser to the Burmese Government and Ministry of Overseas Development.
Roger Crisp – current Professor of Moral Philosophy, Uehiro Fellow and Tutor in Philosophy, Chairman of Management Committee of the Oxford Uehiro Centre for Practical Ethics
Peter Donnelly, FRS – current Fellow (1996–), Australian mathematician and statistician, and current director of the Wellcome Trust Centre for Human Genetics at Oxford University
Bent Flyvbjerg – current Fellow, noted economic geographer, urban planner, and current director of the BT Centre for Major Programme Management at the Saïd Business School
Jenifer Hart – History Fellow
Margaret Hubbard – Australian classical scholar specializing in philology; one of St Anne's 15 founding fellows
Jonathan Katz – stipendiary lecturer, and current University Public Orator
Patrick McGuinness – current Professor of French and Comparative Literature, Fellow and Tutor in French, author, and poet
Georg Gottlob, FRS – current Fellow (since 2006), noted Austrian computer scientist specialising in database theory, logic, and artificial intelligence
A. C. Grayling, FRSA, FRSL – current Supernumerary Fellow, philosopher, author, human rights and civil liberties advocate
Tony Judt, FBA – Fellow (1980–87), author, historian, and public intellectual, later the director of the Erich Maria Remarque Institute at NYU and contributor to the New York Review of Books
John Lloyd – current Supernumerary Fellow, journalist, contributor to the Financial Times, and co-founder of the Reuters Institute for the Study of Journalism at Oxford University
Nick Middleton – current Supernumerary Fellow, physical geographer specialising in desertification, and consultant to the IUCN, UNEP, EU, and WWF.
Iris Murdoch, DBE – Fellow (1948–99), philosopher, and novelist, known for Under the Net and The Sea, The Sea
Graham Nelson – current Supernumerary Fellow (since 2007), mathematician, poet, and noted interactive fiction game designer
Roger Reed – current Supernumerary Fellow, professor of engineering and material science.
Stephen Alexander Smith – Fellow (1991–98), legal scholar and writer
Gabriele Taylor – current senior research fellow, philosopher in ethics

Principals

A list of principals of St Anne's College, Oxford.

1894–1921 Bertha Johnson
1921–1929 Christine Burrows
1929–1940 Grace Eleanor Hadow
1940–1953 Eleanor Plumer
1953–1966 Mary Ogilvie
1966–1984 Nancy Trenaman
1984–1991 Claire Palley
1991–2004 Ruth Deech 
2004–2016 Tim Gardam
2016–2017 Robert Chard (acting)
2017–present: Helen King

References

St Anne's College, Oxford
St Anne's College